The Ginocchio towed torpedo was based on an Italian concept of World War I and consisted of a towed torpedo that was streamed over the stern near a submarine contact in the hope that it would strike the submarine, triggering its warhead. Depth-keeping proved to be a problem during sea trials and it does not appear to have ever been operationally used.

Development and description
The project was revived in late 1938 for the ships of the latter class, but was cancelled in October 1939.

The Ginocchio came in two models, both of which had a  warhead of Trinitrotolulene. 

Citations

References

Anti-submarine weapons
Torpedoes